Cacyreus niebuhri is a butterfly in the family Lycaenidae. It is found in Yemen.

References

Butterflies described in 1982
Cacyreus